The men's 1500 metres T11 event at the 2020 Summer Paralympics in Tokyo took place between 30 and 31 August 2021.

Records
Prior to the competition, the existing records were as follows:

Results

Heats
Heat 1 took place on 30 August 2021, at 9:48:

Heat 2 took place on 30 August 2021, at 9:58:

Final
The final took place on 31 August 2021, at 9:38:

References

Men's 1500 metres T11
2021 in men's athletics